Omorinmade Kuti (born 26 September 1995) known professionally as Made Kuti, is a Nigerian afrobeat singer, songwriter and instrumentalist. He released his debut album titled For(e)ward in 2021.

Early life 
Made Kuti was born to Femi and Funke Kuti on 26 September 1995. He was raised in the New Afrika Shrine. He learned to play multiple musical instruments including the trumpet, alto, sax, piano and drums in his childhood and started playing the trumpet at age 3. He attended Trinity Laban Conservatoire in London which was Fela Kuti's alma mater.

Career 
Made Kuti started out his musical career in childhood as he played the bass and saxophone with his fathers band, Positive Force. He started touring with the band at the age of 8. He released his debut single titled "Free Your Mind" in October 2020.

His debut album was titled For(e)ward which was released solo and as part of a double record titled Legacy+ alongside his father, Femi Kuti. The album was produced by Sodi Marciszewer who had worked with Fela Kuti in the past and was released under Partisan Records. Femi Kuti's Stop the Hate occupies the first 10 tracks of the album while Made Kuti's For(e)ward occupies the last 8 tracks. The cover art is a portrait of Femi Kuti and Made Kuti by Delphine Desane. The album was rated 7.7/10 by a Pulse Nigeria reviewer. His music is described as a blend of jazz, highlife, rock, and reggae.

Made Kuti held an event titled "An evening with Made Kuti" at the Terra Kulture Arena in Lagos where he unveiled his band named The Movement.

He is the son of Nigerian afrobeat musician, Femi Kuti and grandson of afrobeat pioneer, Fela Kuti.

Discography

Singles

Albums 
2021 - For(e)ward

Awards and nominations

References 

Living people
1996 births
Afrobeat musicians
Nigerian songwriters
Saxophonists
Nigerian musicians
Partisan Records artists